Suresh Kumar Routray (born 10 August 1945), also known as Sura Routray, is an Indian politician who currently serves as a member of the Odisha Legislative Assembly, representing the Jatani Assembly constituency.  He first elected in the 1977 Odisha Legislative Assembly election, and was most recently elected as member of the Indian National Congress in the 2019 election.

Early life and education 
Routray was born on 10 August 1945, to Shashikrushna Routray and Malati Routray.  His son-in-law Prasad Kumar Harichandan worked as the Odisha Pradesh Congress Committee President.

Electoral history

References 

Odisha MLAs 2019–2024
Odisha MLAs 1985–1990
Odisha MLAs 1980–1985
Odisha MLAs 1977–1980
People from Khordha district
Living people
Indian politicians
1945 births